The Ohio State Buckeyes women's ice hockey program will represent the Ohio State University during the 2022-23 NCAA Division I women's ice hockey season.

Offseason

Recruiting

Regular season

Standings

Schedule 

Source

|-
!colspan=11 style="  "| Regular Season

Roster

2022–23 Buckeyes

Awards and honors

References 

Ohio State Buckeyes
Ohio State Buckeyes women's ice hockey
Ohio State Buckeyes women's ice hockey
Ohio State Buckeyes women's ice hockey seasons
NCAA women's ice hockey Frozen Four seasons